In phonology, particularly within historical linguistics, dissimilation is a phenomenon whereby similar consonants or vowels in a word become less similar. In English, dissimilation is particularly common with liquid consonants such as /r/ and /l/ when they occur in a sequence.

Examples

Dropped initial /r/ in /r..r/ sequence (r-Deletion) 
When a  sound occurs before another in the middle of a word in rhotic dialects of English, the first tends to drop out, as in "" for berserk, "" for surprise, "" for particular, and "" for governor – this does not affect the pronunciation of government, which has only one , but English government tends to be pronounced "", dropping out the first n.

In English, r-deletion occurs when a syllable is unstressed and  may drop out altogether, as in "" for deteriorate and "" for temperature, a process called haplology. (→ February, which has been explained by phonotactic factors or alternatively by morphological analogy with more common sequences such as January.  nucular, which may have arisen through an analogous process)

Dissimilation of /l..l/ to /r..l/ 
It was formerly spelt coronel and is a borrowing from French coronnel, which arose as a result of dissimilation from Italian colonnello.

Dissimilation of /r..r/ to /l..r/ 
 Latin peregrinus > Old French pelegrin (and the Italian pellegrino and Sicilian piḍḍigrinu) which gave rise to the English .

Causes

There are several hypotheses on the cause of dissimilation. According to John Ohala, listeners are confused by sounds with long-distance acoustic effects. In the case of English , rhoticization spreads across much of the word: in rapid speech, many of the vowels may sound as if they had an r. It may be difficult to tell whether a word has one source of rhoticity or two. When there are two, a listener might wrongly interpret one as an acoustic effect of the other, and so mentally filter it out.

This factoring out of coarticulatory effects has been experimentally replicated. For example, Greek pakhu- (παχυ-) "thick" derives from an earlier *phakhu-. When test subjects are asked to say the *phakhu- form in casual speech, the aspiration from both consonants pervades both syllables, making the vowels breathy. Listeners hear a single effect, breathy voiced vowels, and attribute it to one rather than both of the consonants, as they assume the breathiness on the other syllable to be a long-distance coarticulatory effect, thus replicating the historical change in the Greek word.

If Ohala is correct, one might expect to find dissimilation in other languages with other sounds that frequently cause long-distance effects, such as nasalization and pharyngealization.

Types

Dissimilation, like assimilation, may involve a change in pronunciation relative to a segment that is adjacent to the affected segment or at a distance, and may involve a change relative to a preceding or a following segment. As with assimilation, anticipatory dissimilation is much more common than lag dissimilation, but unlike assimilation, most dissimilation is triggered by non-contiguous segments. Also, while many kinds of assimilation have the character of a sound law, few dissimilations do; most are in the nature of accidents that befall a particular lexical item.

Anticipatory dissimilation
Anticipatory dissimilation at a distance (by far the most common):
 Latin *medio-diēs ("mid-day", i.e. "noon"; also "south") became merīdiēs. Latin venēnum "poison" > Italian veleno.  This category includes a rare example of a systematic sound law, the dissimilation of aspirates in Greek and Sanskrit known as Grassmann's Law: *thi-thē-mi "I put" (with a reduplicated prefix) > Greek tí-thē-mi (τίθημι), *phakhu "thick" > Greek pakhus (παχύς), *sekhō "I have" > *hekhō > Greek ékhō (ἔχω; cf. future *hekh-s-ō > héksō ἕξω). Some apparent cases are problematic, as in English "eksetera" for etcetera, which may rather be contamination from the numerous forms in eks- (or a combination of influences), though the common misspelling ect. implies dissimilation.

Anticipatory dissimilation from a contiguous segment (very rare):
In Sanskrit in any original sequence of two sibilants the first became a stop (often with further developments): root vas- "dress", fut. vas-sya- > vatsya-; *wiś-s "clan" (nom.sg.) > *viťś > *viṭṣ > viṭ (final clusters are simplified); *wiś-su locative pl. > *viṭṣu > vikṣu. English amphitheater is very commonly pronounced ampitheater (though spelling pronunciation may be either some or all of the story here). Russian конфорка  'stove burner' is from Dutch komfoor 'brazier'.

Lag dissimilation
Lag dissimilation at a distance (fairly common):
Latin rārus "rare" > Italian rado. Cardamom is commonly pronounced cardamon. In Middle English, in some words ending in -n preceded by a coronal consonant the -n changed to -m: seldom, random, venom. English marble is ultimately from Latin marmor. Russian февраль  'February' is from Latin Februārius.
In Basque, dissimilation is frequent as well.

Lag dissimilation from a contiguous segment (very rare):
 Latin hominem ("man", acc.)  > Old Spanish omne > omre > Spanish hombre
 Latin nomine ("name", abl.) > nomre > Spanish nombre
 English chimney (standard) > chim(b)ley (dialectal)
 Proto-Slavic *svobodà "freedom" > Slovak sloboda (vs. Czech svoboda)
 In Irish, many dialects regularly change the sequence  to

Paradigmatic dissimilation

When, through sound change, elements of a grammatical paradigm start to conflate in a way that is not easily remedied through re-wording, the forms may dissimilate.

Similarly, it appears that English she, historically heo, may have acquired its modern sh form through dissimilation from he, though it is not clear whether the mechanism was idiosyncratic sound change (palatalization) of heo, or substitution of heo with the feminine demonstrative pronoun seo.

See also
 Assimilation (linguistics)

References

Sources
 Crowley, Terry. (1997) An Introduction to Historical Linguistics. 3rd edition. Oxford University Press.
 Vasmer's dictionary
 Dissimilation (International Encyclopedia of Linguistics, 2nd ed.)

Phonology
Sound changes